Hierarchy theory is a means of studying ecological systems in which the relationship between all of the components is of great complexity. Hierarchy theory focuses on levels of organization and issues of scale, with a specific focus on the role of the observer in the definition of the system. Complexity in this context does not refer to an intrinsic property of the system but to the possibility of representing the systems in a plurality of non-equivalent ways depending on the pre-analytical choices of the observer. Instead of analyzing the whole structure, hierarchy theory refers to the analysis of hierarchical levels, and the interactions between them.

See also
 Biological organisation
 Timothy F. H. Allen
 Deep history
 Big history
 Deep time
 Deep ecology
 Infrastructure-based development
 World-systems theory
 Structuralist economics
 Dependency theory

References

Further reading
 
 
 
 
 
 
 
 
 

Hierarchy
Systems ecology